James Yaegashi is a Japanese American actor based in New York.

Early life
James Yaegashi was born in Yokohama and raised in Yamagata to an American mother and a Japanese father. Upon graduating high school, he moved to America and majored in acting and directing at University of Missouri–Kansas City. He moved to New York with his wife in 1998.

Career
He has acted in various stage productions, including as Mr. Yunioshi in a stage production of Breakfast at Tiffany's; a role that had historically been played in yellowface. Of the character Yaegashi said "He’s a real character, for starters. The film...made so many changes to the story...Yunioshi is a Nisei, a Japanese American from California. In the movie, Mickey Rooney played him as if he was fresh off the boat." He ultimately felt it was necessary to play the character to portray ethnic characters in a positive light. Yaegashi first entered the Marvel Cinematic Universe with a minor role in Daredevil, but had a more notable role when he was cast as Robert Minoru in the Hulu original series Runaways based on the Marvel Comics series. In 2004, he voiced the Chinese Triad leader, Wu Zi Mu, in the video game, Grand Theft Auto: San Andreas. He later also voiced an undercover police officer called Charlie in GTA IV' and GTA IV: The Lost and Damned''.

Personal life
Yaegashi is married with two children. He is also bilingual.

Filmography

References

External links

American male actors of Japanese descent
Male voice actors from Yokohama
Japanese emigrants to the United States
Year of birth missing (living people)
University of Missouri–Kansas City alumni
Living people
American male film actors
American male television actors
American male video game actors
American male voice actors
American film actors of Asian descent
Japanese male film actors
Japanese male television actors
Japanese male video game actors
Japanese male voice actors
Japanese people of American descent
20th-century American male actors
20th-century Japanese male actors
21st-century American male actors
21st-century Japanese male actors